InterLiga 2004 was the 1st edition of the tournament in which two Mexican clubs got the opportunity to represent the FMF and Mexico in 2004 Copa Libertadores.

Venues

Qualification

Group stage

Group A

Group B

Final

Mexico 3

Goalscorers 
The scorers from the 2004 InterLiga

External links 
 Official site (in Spanish and English)

2003–04 in Mexican football
2004
2004 domestic association football leagues